Bosistoa transversa, commonly known as the yellow satinheart, or three-leaved bosistoa, is a species of small to medium-sized rainforest tree that is endemic to eastern Australia. It has mostly pinnate leaves, usually with three leaflets and panicles of small white flowers.

Description
The leaves usually have three, sometimes up to seven glossy leaflets with prominent oil glands. Flowering occurs from December to May and is followed by pairs of small woody, oval follicles that ripen from May to July.

Taxonomy
Yellow satinheart was first formally described in 1917 by Queensland botanists John Frederick Bailey and Cyril Tenison White and the description was published in the Botany Bulletin of the Department of Agriculture, Queensland. The generic name Bosistoa honours the name of Joseph Bosisto, a manufacturer of essential oils. The specific epithet transversa refers to the transversal ribbed carpels of the fruit.

Distribution and habitat
Bosistoa transversa occurs from Mount Larcom in central-eastern Queensland, south to Mullumbimby in north eastern New South Wales.

Conservation status
The yellow satinheart is classified as vulnerable under the Australian Government Environment Protection and Biodiversity Conservation Act 1999 and in New South Wales under the Biodiversity Conservation Act 2016. The main threats to the species include clearing of rainforests, invasion of remaining rainforest areas by weeds, and grazing by livestock.

References

transversa
Sapindales of Australia
Flora of New South Wales
Flora of Queensland
Plants described in 1917
Taxa named by Frederick Manson Bailey
Taxa named by Cyril Tenison White